The Mosedale Horseshoe is a celebrated mountain walk around Mosedale in the English Lake District: starting at Wasdale Head, it includes Kirk Fell, Yewbarrow, Red Pike, Scoat Fell, and Pillar.

Shorter versions can be made by omitting Yewbarrow and Kirk Fell, at start and finish, and (perhaps) the summit of Scoat Fell.

Wainwright's warning

Alfred Wainwright placed the round among his dozen best lakeland ridge walks; but also warned that the full version was "an exhilarating mountain marathon for experienced fellwalkers only".

See also
Black Crag
Coledale horseshoe
Fairfield horseshoe
Mosedale Beck (Wast Water)

References

Walking in the United Kingdom
Geography of Cumbria
Tourist attractions in Cumbria